Mullahalli is a village in Dharwad district of Karnataka, India.

Demographics 
As of the 2011 Census of India there were 236 households in Mullahalli and a total population of 1,041 consisting of 534 males and 507 females. There were 133 children ages 0-6.

References

Villages in Dharwad district